A list of films produced in Italy in 2003 (see 2003 in film):

See also
2003 in Italy
2003 in Italian television

External links
Italian films of 2003 at the Internet Movie Database

2003
Films
Italian